Duke Zhuang of Chen (reigned 699 BC – died 693 BC) was the fifteenth ruler of the ancient Chinese state of Chen during the Spring and Autumn period. His ancestral surname was Gui, given name Lin (林), and Zhuang (莊) was his posthumous name.

Lin was a middle son of Duke Huan of Chen, whose brother Chen Tuo murdered Lin's eldest brother Crown Prince Mian and usurped the throne in 707 BC. The army of the neighbouring State of Cai killed Chen Tuo in 706 BC and installed Duke Li of Chen, another brother of Lin, on the throne.

Duke Li reigned for seven years and died in 700 BC. However, it was his younger brother Lin (Duke Zhuang) who succeeded him, instead of his son Chen Wan.

In 698 BC, Chen joined the armies of Song, Qi, Cai, and Wey to attack the State of Zheng. Song led the attack, to avenge an earlier attack on Song by Zheng. The allied forces burned the Qu gate of the Zheng capital and entered the city. In 697 and 696 BC, Chen and other states attacked Zheng two more times.

Duke Zhuang died in 693 BC, after a reign of seven years. He was also succeeded by his younger brother,  Chujiu, who was known as Duke Xuan of Chen.

References

Bibliography

Monarchs of Chen (state)
7th-century BC Chinese monarchs
693 BC deaths